Omar Elhussieny (born 3 November 1985) is an Egyptian footballer. He is an attacking midfielder, who can also play as a striker or a winger. 
 
Omar Elhussieny won all trophies in Estonia being crowned with FC Levadia Tallinn in 2014 with the titles of Meistriliiga, Estonian Cup and Estonian Super Cup.

Europe

Elhussieny featured for Levadia in edition of UEFA Champions League scoring 1 goal and assisting twice in 5 appearances.

Mohun Bagan
On 5 October 2018, Elhussieny switched to Mohun Bagan.
On 4 March 2019, Elhussieny released from Mohun Bagan.

References

1985 births
Living people
Egyptian footballers
Paide Linnameeskond players
Meistriliiga players
FCI Levadia Tallinn players
Association football midfielders
Eastern Company SC players
People from Giza Governorate
Egyptian expatriate footballers
Expatriate footballers in Estonia
Expatriate footballers in India
Expatriate footballers in Indonesia
Expatriate footballers in Malta
Egyptian expatriate sportspeople in Estonia
Egyptian expatriate sportspeople in India
Egyptian expatriate sportspeople in Indonesia
Egyptian expatriate sportspeople in Malta